Smith Lake is an unincorporated community in McKinley County, New Mexico, United States.

It is in Gallup-McKinley County Public Schools. Zoned schools are Thoreau Elementary School, Thoreau Middle School, and Thoreau High School.

References

Unincorporated communities in McKinley County, New Mexico
Unincorporated communities in New Mexico